Roman Rupp (born 25 January 1964) is an Austrian former alpine skier.

References

1964 births
Living people
Austrian male alpine skiers
Place of birth missing (living people)